is a passenger railway station located in the city of Akashi, Hyōgo, Japan, operated by West Japan Railway Company (JR West). As part of the Urban Network, the ICOCA, Suica, PiTaPa, TOICA and SUGOCA can all be used on the San'yō Main Line (they can not be used for Shinkansen service).

Lines

Station layout
The Shinkansen and regular train platforms are located some distance from each other, and are connected by a pedestrian overpass located above a public road. As the overpass to the regular platform is inaccessible from the south entrance to the station, passengers are allowed to access it via the Shinkansen side of the station.The station has a Midori no Madoguchi staffed ticket office.

Barrier-free access
In order to better serve passengers with different needs, escalators and elevators are located in the following areas:
Escalator
Within the west concourse area, one ascending and one descending
Elevators
East entrance: On the north and south sides, accessible without need of a ticket
West entrance: One each on the concourse, Shinkansen platform, and regular train platform

Platforms
The San'yō Shinkansen has two elevated opposed side platforms. There are two pass-through lines between the two platforms as well, allowing trains to go through the station without stopping. The San'yō Main Line (JR Kōbe Line) has three island platforms which can handle six trains simultaneously.

Adjacent stations

History

Nishi-Akashi station opened on 1 April 1944. With the privatization of the Japan National Railways (JNR) on 1 April 1987, the station came under the aegis of the West Japan Railway Company.

Station numbering was introduced to the Kobe Line platforms in March 2018 with Nishi-Akashi being assigned station number JR-A74.

Passenger statistics
In fiscal 2019, the station was used by an average of 32,049 passengers daily

Surrounding area
Kōbe Nishi-ku Branch Municipal Offices
Kawasaki Heavy Industries Akashi Plant

Highway access
National Route 2
National Route 250
Hyōgo Prefectural Route 21 (Kōbe-Akashi Route)

See also
List of railway stations in Japan

References

External links  

 JR West station information 

JR Kobe Line
Sanyō Main Line
Sanyō Shinkansen
Railway stations in Hyōgo Prefecture
Railway stations in Japan opened in 1944
Akashi, Hyōgo